Thangman Kangri is one of highest peak in the remote Rimo Muztagh, a subrange of the Karakoram range in Ladakh union territory of India.

Location 
The mountain is flanked by the South Chong Kumdan Glacier to the north and the Thangman Glacier to the south.

Climbing history
There are no documented ascents of Thangman Kangri.

References 

Six-thousanders of the Himalayas
Mountains of Ladakh